McCammond is a surname. Notable people with the surname include:

 Alexi McCammond (born 1994), American political journalist
 William McCammond, 19th century Irish politician

See also
 McCammon